Operation Placid was a Rhodesian military operation in Zambia with clandestine assistance from the South African Air Force (SAAF) during the Rhodesian Bush War. The Rhodesian Air Force planned raids against a ZIPRA camps in Zambia on the northern Rhodesian border.

Operation
The operation consisted of two raids on ZIPRA camps on 22 August 1979. The South African Air Force provided three Canberra bombers (12 Squadron SAAF) with crew for the operation which would include Rhodesian Air Force Canberra's and Hawker Hunter fighters. The aircraft of Operation Placid I departed at 09h15 from Fylde airbase, the Canberra's armed with two 1000lb and nine 500lb  bombs for the targets in Zambia. During the operation the Zambian Air Force launched Shenyang F-6 fighters to intercept the operation but failed to intercept the formation.

Aftermath
Operation Placid II took place on the same day at 15h40 and re-attacked the morning targets and again the Zambian Air Force launched Shenyang F-6 fighters to intercept the operation but failed.

References

Bibliography
 
 

1979 in Rhodesia
1979 in South Africa
1979 in Zambia
August 1979 events in Africa
Battles and operations of the Rhodesian Bush War
Conflicts in 1979
Military operations of the Rhodesian Bush War involving South Africa
Rhodesia–Zambia relations